Raymond Hackett (July 15, 1902 – July 7, 1958) was an American stage and screen actor. He had been a child actor on the Broadway stage and was the brother of Albert Hackett. He was born in New York City the son of Maurice Hackett and Florence Hackett (née Hart). His mother was later a silent screen actress. Hackett's first wife was Myra Hampton, the marriage was dissolved. His second wife was the actress Blanche Sweet.

As a child he first appeared on stage in New York in 1907 in The Toymaker of Nuremberg; Nov. 25, 1907 Garrick Theatre. In Sept. 1909 he appeared with Margaret Anglin in the play The Awakening of Helena Richie. In early silent films was called Master Raymond Hackett and appeared with his brother Albert in several shorts and one 1921 feature film The Country Flapper co-starring Dorothy Gish and Glenn Hunter. Had a major adult Broadway success in The Cradle Snatchers 1925 with Mary Boland and Humphrey Bogart. Hackett was popular in early sound films but his movie career ceased about 1931.

Filmography

References

External links

 
 portrait of Raymond Hackett NY Public Library; Billy Rose collection
 Hackett as a child actor and adult University of Washington; Sayre collection
 Raymond Hackett(aveleyman)

1902 births
1958 deaths
American male stage actors
American male film actors
American male silent film actors
Male actors from New York City
Burials at Chapel of the Pines Crematory
20th-century American male actors